Stephen Grenfell may refer to:

 Stephen Grenfell (broadcaster) (died 1989), writer and BBC Radio broadcaster
 Stephen Grenfell (footballer) (born 1966), English footballer